Nelidovo is a town and the administrative center of Nelidovsky District in Tver Oblast, Russia, located in the Valdai Hills area on the Mezha River (Western Dvina's tributary),  southwest of Tver, the administrative center of the oblast. Population:

History
Nelidovo was founded in 1898 near a railway station of the same name on the private Moscow-Vindava-Rybinsk Railway,  from Moscow's Rizhsky railway station. It belonged to Belsky Uyezd of Smolensk Governorate.

On 12 July 1929, governorates and uyezds were abolished, and Nelidovsky District with the administrative center in the settlement of Nelidovo was established. It belonged to Rzhev Okrug of Western Oblast. On August 1, 1930 the okrugs were abolished, and the districts were subordinated directly to the oblast. On 29 January 1935 Kalinin Oblast was established, and Nelidovsky District was transferred to Kalinin Oblast. During World War II, in 1941—1942, Nelidovo was occupied by German troops. On August 22, 1944, the district was transferred to newly established Velikiye Luki Oblast. Nelidovo was granted town status in 1949.
On October 2, 1957, Velikiye Luki Oblast was abolished, and Nelidovsky District was transferred back to Kalinin Oblast. In 1990, Kalinin Oblast was renamed Tver Oblast.

Administrative and municipal status
Within the framework of administrative divisions, Nelidovo serves as the administrative center of Nelidovsky District. As an administrative division, it is incorporated within Nelidovsky District as Nelidovo Urban Settlement. As a municipal division, this administrative unit also has urban settlement status and is a part of Nelidovsky Municipal District.

Economy

Industry
Originally, Nelidovo was built to serve lignite deposits. The lignite mines are still active. Additionally, there are enterprises of timber, textile, and chemical industries in Nelidovo.

Transportation

The railway which connects Moscow and Riga via Rzhev, crosses the district from east to west. There is passenger railway traffic.

The M9 highway connecting Moscow with Riga passes just north of Nelidovo. Another paved road connects Nelidovo with Dukhovshchina via Bely. There are also local roads with bus traffic originating from Nelidovo.

Culture and recreation
Nelidovo has four cultural heritage monuments of local significance, which are graves of soldiers fallen in the World War II.

In 2009, the mining museum was opened in Nelidovo.

References

Notes

Sources

Cities and towns in Tver Oblast
Smolensk Governorate